Nong Chom is a tambon (subdistrict) of San Sai District, in Chiang Mai Province, Thailand. In 2005 it had a population of 13,657 people. The tambon contains nine villages.

References

Populated places in Chiang Mai province
Tambon of Chiang Mai province